Wilson Canyon Park is a public park located in the western San Gabriel Mountains, in the neighborhood of Sylmar in the northeastern San Fernando Valley in the northern portion of the City of Los Angeles, California.

History 
The park is named after Wilson Canyon in which the Wilson family ranch was located, founded by Christopher North Wilson of Ohio, an early anglo-american settler of the San Fernando Valley who traveled with his family from their hometown of Meadville Pennsylvania and arrived in California with his family in early 1871. C. N. Wilson was survived solely by his son John Thomas Wilson, who remained in the San Fernando Valley and would set up his residence in the City of San Fernando; there, in 1888, he would marry María Expectación Graciosa or Grace López, daughter of Gerónimo and Catalina López, prominent californios and members of one of the original families of Spanish settlers of California. Part of the Wilson Ranch was ceded for the establishment of the Olive View Sanatorium in 1920. J. T. Wilson passed away at the age of 90 in April 1947.

In the following years, especially in the 1960's, the community of Sylmar to the south of the ranch would go from being primarily rural, mostly olive plantations, to slowly becoming more suburbanized. The area that now encompasses the park would go mostly undeveloped except for the work of flood control works. Finally, the Santa Monica Mountains Conservancy, a member of the Mountains Recreation and Conservation Authority, purchased  of land in Wilson Canyon and opened Wilson Canyon Park in 1996.

Description 
It has a relatively secluded wilderness and networks of easy to moderate trails. It is popular with hikers, ecuestrians, mountain bikers, bird watchers and picnicers.

Access 
The entrance to the park is located to the east of Olive View Medical Center on Olive View Drive, from the entrance the park road takes you  to the main trail heads and parking areas. The park provides parking near the main trailheads for a $5 fee, but it is also possible for visitors to park on Olive View Drive and walk up the park road to the main park area. The park has easy access from the Foothill Freeway and is a popular portal to the adjacent Angeles National Forest to the north.

See also 

 San Gabriel Mountains
 California chaparral and woodlands - Ecoregion
 California oak woodland - plant community
 O'Melveny Park

References 

Parks in Los Angeles County, California
San Gabriel Mountains
Sylmar, Los Angeles
Parks in the San Fernando Valley
History of the San Fernando Valley